George Roosevelt may refer to:

 George Emlen Roosevelt (1887–1963), banker and philanthropist
 George W. Roosevelt (1843–1907), Medal of Honor recipient